In physics, action at a distance is the concept that an object can be affected without being physically touched (as in mechanical contact) by another object. That is, it is the non-local interaction of objects that are separated in space.
Non-contact forces is action at a distance affecting specifically an object's motion.

This term was used most often in the context of early theories of gravity and electromagnetism to describe how an object responds to the influence of distant objects. For example, Coulomb's law and Newton's law of universal gravitation are such early theories.

More generally, "action at a distance" describes the failure of early atomistic and mechanistic theories which sought to reduce all physical interaction to collision. The exploration and resolution of this problematic phenomenon led to significant developments in physics, from the concept of a field, to descriptions of quantum entanglement and the mediator particles of the Standard Model.

Electricity and magnetism
Philosopher William of Ockham discussed action at a distance to explain magnetism and the ability of the Sun to heat the Earth's atmosphere without affecting the intervening space.

Efforts to account for action at a distance in the theory of electromagnetism led to the development of the concept of a field which mediated interactions between currents and charges across empty space. According to field theory, we account for the Coulomb (electrostatic) interaction between charged particles through the fact that charges produce around themselves an electric field, which can be felt by other charges as a force. Maxwell directly addressed the subject of action-at-a-distance in chapter 23 of his A Treatise on Electricity and Magnetism in 1873. He began by reviewing the explanation of Ampère's formula given by Gauss and Weber. On page 437 he indicates the physicists' disgust with action at a distance. In 1845 Gauss wrote to Weber desiring "action, not instantaneous, but propagated in time in a similar manner to that of light". This aspiration was developed by Maxwell with the theory of an electromagnetic field described by Maxwell's equations, which used the field to elegantly account for all electromagnetic interactions, now also including light (which, until then, had only been suspected as a related phenomenon). In Maxwell's theory, the field is its own physical entity, carrying momenta and energy across space, and action-at-a-distance is only the apparent effect of local interactions of charges with their surrounding field.

Electrodynamics was later described without fields (in Minkowski space)  as the direct interaction of particles with lightlike separation vectors. This resulted in the Fokker-Tetrode-Schwarzschild action integral. This kind of electrodynamic theory is often called "direct interaction" to distinguish it from field theories where action at a distance is mediated by a localized field (localized in the sense that its dynamics are determined by the nearby field parameters). This description of electrodynamics, in contrast with Maxwell's theory, explains apparent action at a distance not by postulating a mediating entity (a field) but by appealing to the natural geometry of special relativity.

Direct interaction electrodynamics is explicitly symmetrical in time and avoids the infinite energy predicted in the field immediately surrounding point particles.  Feynman and Wheeler have shown that it can account for radiation and radiative damping (which had been considered strong evidence for the independent existence of the field). However, various proofs, beginning with that of Dirac, have shown that direct interaction theories (under reasonable assumptions) do not admit Lagrangian or Hamiltonian formulations (these are the so-called No Interaction Theorems). Also significant is the measurement and theoretical description of the Lamb shift  which strongly suggests that charged particles interact with their own field.  Fields, because of these and other difficulties, have been elevated to the fundamental operators in Quantum Field Theory and Modern physics has thus largely abandoned direct interaction theory.

Gravity

Newton
Newton's classical theory of gravity offered no prospect of identifying any mediator of gravitational interaction. His theory assumed that gravitation acts instantaneously, regardless of distance.  Kepler's observations gave strong evidence that in planetary motion angular momentum is conserved. (The mathematical proof is valid only in the case of a Euclidean geometry.) Gravity is also known as a force of attraction between two objects because of their mass.

From a Newtonian perspective, action at a distance can be regarded as "a phenomenon in which a change in intrinsic properties of one system induces a change in the intrinsic properties of a distant system, independently of the influence of any other systems on the distant system, and without there being a process that carries this influence contiguously in space and time" (Berkovitz 2008).

A related question, raised by Ernst Mach, was how rotating bodies know how much to bulge at the equator. This, it seems, requires an action-at-a-distance from distant matter, informing the rotating object about the state of the universe. Einstein coined the term Mach's principle for this question.

Different authors have attempted to clarify the aspects of remote action and God’s involvement on the basis of textual investigations, mainly from the Mathematical Principles of Natural Philosophy, Newton’s correspondence with Richard Bentley (1692/93), and Queries that Newton introduced at the end of the Opticks book in the first three editions (between 1704 and 1721).

Andrew Janiak, in Newton as philosopher, considered that Newton denied that gravity could be essential to matter, dismissed direct action at a distance, and also rejected the idea of a material substance. But Newton agreed, in Janiak’s view, with an immaterial ether, which he considered that Newton identifies himself with God himself: “Newton obviously thinks that God might be the very “immaterial medium” underlying all gravitational interactions among material bodies.”

Steffen Ducheyne, in Newton on Action at a Distance, considered that Newton never accepted direct remote action, only material intervention or immaterial substance.

Hylarie Kochiras, in Gravity and Newton’s substance counting problem, argued that Newton was inclined to reject direct action, giving priority to the hypothesis of an intangible environment. But, in his speculative moments, Newton oscillated between accepting and rejecting direct remote action. Newton, according to Kochiras, claims that God is a virtual omnipresent, the force/agent must subsist in substance, and God is omnipresent substantially, resulting in a hidden premise, the principle of local action.

Eric Schliesser, in Newton’s substance monism, distant action, and the nature of Newton’s Empiricism, argued that Newton does not categorically refuse the idea that matter is active, and therefore accepted the possibility of a direct action at a distance. Newton affirms the virtual omnipresence of God in addition to his substantial omnipresence.

John Henry, in Gravity and De gravitatione: The Development of Newton’s Ideas on Action at a Distance, also argued that direct remote action was not inconceivable for Newton, rejecting the idea that gravity can be explained by subtle matter, accepting the idea of an omnipotent God, and rejecting the Epicurean attraction.

For further discussion see Ducheyne, S. "Newton on Action at a Distance". Journal of the History of Philosophy vol. 52.4 (2014): 675–702.

Einstein
According to Albert Einstein's theory of special relativity, instantaneous action at a distance violates the relativistic upper limit on speed of propagation of information. If one of the interacting objects were to suddenly be displaced from its position, the other object would feel its influence instantaneously, meaning information had been transmitted faster than the speed of light.

One of the conditions that a relativistic theory of gravitation must meet is that gravity is mediated with a speed that does not exceed , the speed of light in vacuum. From the previous success of electrodynamics, it was foreseeable that the relativistic theory of gravitation would have to use the concept of a field, or something similar.

This has been achieved by Einstein's theory of general relativity, in which gravitational interaction is mediated by deformation of space-time geometry. Matter warps the geometry of space-time, and these effects are—as with electric and magnetic fields—propagated at the speed of light. Thus, in the presence of matter, space-time becomes non-Euclidean, resolving the apparent conflict between Newton's proof of the conservation of angular momentum and Einstein's theory of special relativity.

Mach's question regarding the bulging of rotating bodies is resolved because local space-time geometry is informing a rotating body about the rest of the universe. In Newton's theory of motion, space acts on objects, but is not acted upon. In Einstein's theory of motion, matter acts upon space-time geometry, deforming it; and space-time geometry acts upon matter, by affecting the behavior of geodesics.

As a consequence, and unlike the classical theory, general relativity predicts that accelerating masses emit gravitational waves, i.e. disturbances in the curvature of spacetime that propagate outward at lightspeed. Their existence (like many other aspects of relativity) has been experimentally confirmed by astronomers—most dramatically in the direct detection of gravitational waves originating from a black hole merger when they passed through LIGO in 2015.

Quantum mechanics

Since the early twentieth century, quantum mechanics has posed new challenges for the view that physical processes should obey locality. Whether quantum entanglement counts as action-at-a-distance hinges on the nature of the wave function and decoherence, issues over which there is still considerable debate among scientists and philosophers.

One important line of debate originated with Einstein, who challenged the idea that quantum mechanics offers a complete description of reality, along with Boris Podolsky and Nathan Rosen. They proposed a thought experiment involving an entangled pair of observables with non-commuting operators (e.g. position and momentum).

This thought experiment, which came to be known as the EPR paradox, hinges on the principle of locality. A common presentation of the paradox is as follows: two particles interact and fly off in opposite directions. Even when the particles are so far apart that any classical interaction would be impossible (see principle of locality), certain measurements of one particle nonetheless determine the result of corresponding measurements of the other.

After the EPR paper, several scientists such as de Broglie studied local hidden variables theories. In the 1960s John Bell derived an inequality that indicated a testable difference between the predictions of quantum mechanics and local hidden variables theories.  To date, all experiments testing Bell-type inequalities in situations analogous to the EPR thought experiment have results consistent with the predictions of quantum mechanics, suggesting that local hidden variables theories can be ruled out. Whether or not this is interpreted as evidence for nonlocality depends on one's interpretation of quantum mechanics.

Interpretations of quantum mechanics vary in their response to the EPR-type experiments. The Bohm interpretation gives an explanation based on nonlocal hidden variables for the correlations seen in entanglement. Many advocates of the many-worlds interpretation argue that it can explain these correlations in a way that does not require a violation of locality, by allowing measurements to have non-unique outcomes.

If "action" is defined as a force, physical work or information, then it should be stated clearly that entanglement cannot communicate action between two entangled particles (Einstein's worry about "spooky action at a distance" does not actually violate special relativity). What happens in entanglement is that a measurement on one entangled particle yields a random result, then a later measurement on another particle in the same entangled (shared) quantum state must always yield a value correlated with the first measurement. Since no force, work, or information is communicated (the first measurement is random), the speed of light limit does not apply (see Quantum entanglement and Bell test experiments). In the standard Copenhagen interpretation, as discussed above, entanglement demonstrates a genuine nonlocal effect of quantum mechanics, but does not communicate information, either quantum or classical.

See also 

 Dynamism (metaphysics)
 Einstein's thought experiments
 Interaction-free measurement
 Quantum pseudo-telepathy
 Quantum teleportation
 Remote sensing
 Wheeler–Feynman absorber theory

References

External links 

 

Action at a distance